The 19th South American Junior Championships in Athletics were held in Santiago, Chile from September 24–27, 1987.

Participation (unofficial)
Detailed result lists can be found on the "World Junior Athletics History" website.  An unofficial count yields the number of about 251 athletes from about 10 countries:    Argentina (50), Bolivia (8), Brazil (49), Chile (51), Colombia (5), Ecuador (17), Paraguay (13), Peru (27), Uruguay (14), Venezuela (17).

Medal summary
Medal winners are published for men and women
Complete results can be found on the "World Junior Athletics History" website.

Men

Women

Medal table (unofficial)

References

External links
World Junior Athletics History

South American U20 Championships in Athletics
1987 in Chilean sport
South American U20 Championships
International athletics competitions hosted by Chile
1987 in youth sport